Reissita simonyi, the Arabian burnet moth, is a species of diurnal moth of the Zygaenidae family. It is the only species from the genus Reissita, and native to the southern part of the Arabian Peninsula. It resembles some species from the related genus Zygaena, and like them Reissita simonyi is toxic because it is able to biosynthesize hydrogen cyanide. The larvae feed on Maytenus, specifically M. dhofarensis and M. senegalensis.

It has two subspecies: 
Blackish with a bluish sheen and red spots.
Smaller than previous, and blackish with a greenish-blue sheen and red spots, or all red (some males only).

References
 Reissita at funet.fi
 Klütsch, C. F. C. (2006). Evolutionary history of Southern Arabian faunal elements with a special focus on habitat fragmentation of two model organisms, Reissita simonyi (REBEL, 1899; Lepidoptera: Zygaenidae) and Hyla savignyi (AUDOUIN, 1827; Amphibia: Hylidae). Ph.D. dissertation, University of Bonn.

Zygaeninae
Monotypic moth genera
Zygaenidae genera
Moths of Asia